Sivaangi Krishnakumar (born 25 May 2000), also known as Sivaangi, is an Indian actress, playback singer and television personality. In 2019, she participated in the singing competition Super Singer 7, which was aired on Star Vijay and, in 2020, she appeared in the comedy-cooking show, Cooku With Comali, which gained her popularity. She is the daughter of Kalaimamani winners. K Krishnakumar and Binni Krishnakumar. She has acted in films such as  Don (2022), Naai Sekar Returns (2022) and Kasethan Kadavulada.

She made her debut as a singer in the Tamil film Pasanga in 2009 with the song "Anbaale Azhagaagum".. She is well known for singing songs such as Anbaale (2009), Talku Lessu Worku Moreu (2021), Machi (2021),, Uruttu (2021), Nee En Usuru Pulla (2021), Sathiyama Sollurandi (2021), Bomma Bomma (2021), Neethanada (2022) and Rekkalu thodigi (2022). She is currently singing 2 songs which are set to release in second half of 2022.

She also acted in the commercially successful film Don marking her debut film in the cinema industry. She was later cast in a supporting role opposing actor Vadivelu in the film Naai Sekar Returns.

Sivaangi has received five awards listing from Blacksheep Awards for Best Entertainer of the year-Female 2021, Behindwoods Gold Icon Awards for Most Popular person on reality television-Female 2021, Youth Icon of Digital from Galatta Digital Stars Awards and Radio City Women Entertainer Awards for Television Category 2022.

Early life 
Sivaangi was born in Trivandrum, Kerala to a Malayali mother and Tamil father on 25 May 2000. Her father, Krishnakumar, is a singer and a musicologist, and her mother, Binni Krishnakumar is a playback singer. Both her parents are recipients of Kalaimamani Award. She also has a younger brother, Vinaayak Sunder. After Sivaangi was born, her parents moved to Chennai, Tamil Nadu. She did her schooling in Chinmaya Vidyalaya,Virugambakkam, Chennai. She later completed her bachelor's degree in Commerce at M.O.P. Vaishnav College for Women, Chennai. During her college days, she ventured into the music industry.

Career 
After a 10-year-long hiatus, in 2019, Sivaangi Krishnakumar made her appearance as a contestant in an Indian Tamil-language reality television singing competition Super Singer 7 which aired on Star Vijay.

She later was a part of the comedy cooking show, Cooku With Comali that aired on Star Vijay. She  had got a lot of recognition and appreciation through this show. She got the following awards after the second season of the show:  The Entertaining Star Female by Blacksheep Digital Awards and Most Popular Female in Reality Television by Behindwoods Gold Icons. She had also won a award for Trending pair of the year (along with Ashwin Kumar Lakshmikanthan) at the Vijay Television Awards.

In 2020, She also made her debut as a "web series actress" in the comedy web series Dear-u Brother-u which received an overall successful run in box office and was widely talked among audiences and netizens.

In 2021, Sivaangi sang "Asku Maaro" alongside Dharan Kumar in which she also made a cameo appearance. Later in May 2021, she sang "Talku Lessu Worku Moreu" for the movie Murungakkai Chips alongside Sam Vishal. She later sang the song 'Adipoli' alongside Vineeth Sreenivasan which was released in 2021 as an Onam special. 

In November of 2021, Media Masons released its 3rd original 'No No No No'. The song was sung by Sivaangi while the rap portions were done by KJ Iyenar. 

Sivaangi sang "Andhapura Annakili Da" under the music composition of P.S Ashwin and "Nee Yen Usuru Pulla" alongside G. V. Prakash under the music composition of Siddhu Kumar. She later sang two songs "Uruttu" and "Neethanada" for the film Enna Solla Pogirai. She also sang the song "Sathiyama Sollurandi" for the film Velan alongside actor Mugen Rao. She recently sang a melody song named "Saaya" which was released in both Tamil and Malayalam. 

After her appearance in Cooku With Comali, she was cast in the Tamil film, Don and it also marks her acting debut. She is also cast in the movie Naai Sekar Returns alongside actor Vadivelu.  She is doing a prominent role alongside Shiva and Priya Anand in the film Kasethan Kadavulada.

In 2022, she also sung the song "Nenjellam" in the film Sinam. 

She runs a YouTube channel named Sivaangi Krishnakumar.

Filmography

Films

Television

Web series

Discography

Film Songs 
All songs are in Tamil unless otherwise noted.

Independent Songs

Cover Songs

Accolades

Awards and nominations

Other recognitions

She was listed by the Indiaglitz website as the  "Desirable Woman on Television 2020".
She also received Galatta Tamil Channel's "Namma Veetu Pillai" award in 2021.

References

External links

 

2000 births
People from Kerala
Indian film actresses
Living people
Tamil television actresses
Actresses in Tamil cinema
Tamil actresses
Telugu actresses
Singers from Tamil Nadu
Singers from Kerala
Indian women playback singers
Tamil singers
Telugu playback singers
Tamil-language singers
21st-century Indian singers
21st-century Indian actresses
Television personalities from Tamil Nadu
Television personalities from Kerala
Indian television presenters